The 2002 House elections in Missouri occurred on November 5, 2002 to elect the members of the State of Missouri's delegation to the United States House of Representatives. Missouri had nine seats in the House, apportioned according to the 2000 United States Census.

These elections were held concurrently with the United States Senate elections of 2002 (including a special election in Missouri), the United States House elections in other states, and various state and local elections.

Overview

2002 Missouri House elections

See also
 United States House of Representatives elections, 2002

References

2002
Missouri
2002 Missouri elections